Chris Bailey (born 1965) is a Māori sculptor and carver. Bailey studied Māori language and Māori material culture at the University of Auckland under Dante Bonica. He lives and works on Waiheke Island.

Gravitating towards the harder stones of basalt and granite Bailey developed form driven stone works in a larger scale while also developing his carving skills working in totara alongside carvers of Piritahi Marae on Waiheke Island.

Recognition
Bailey has exhibited both nationally and internationally, winning the 2014 Wallace Arts Trust New Zealand Sculptor Award for his Bondi Points at the Bondi Beach, Sculpture by the Sea. He has received financial support from Creative New Zealand to produce works. In 2010, Ringa Whao a documentary about Bailey's practice was produced by Rongo Productions. In 2011, he completed a public commission of carved pou situated outside Britomart Transport Centre in Auckland. Recognised for starting the pou (carved timber pallisade post) movement on Waiheke Island in recognition of the islands Māori history which saw other sculptors take up the art form in later years.

 Bondi Blades, Winner James Wallace Trust New Zealand Sculptor 2014 for Sculpture by the Sea Bondi, Australia
 Pou Tu Te Rangi, nominated for IAPA International Public Art Award for South East Asian Region, 2014
 Toi Iho, life time status granted in recognition of the quality of his stone work.

Selected exhibitions
2017              
 Headland Sculpture on the Gulf, Waiheke Island, New Zealand
2016              
 Imago Mundi: New Zealand Collection exhibition, Treviso, Italy.
 Sculpt Oneroa, Waiheke island, New Zealand
2015               
 Sculpture by the Sea, Cottesloe Beach, Perth, Australia
 Show and Tell, Milford Galleries, Dunedin, New Zealand
2014
 Sculpture by the Sea, Bondi, Sydney, Australia
 Sculpture by the Sea, Cottesloe Beach, Perth, Australia
 Te Toi Hou – Contemporary Maori Art, Northart, Auckland, New Zealand
2013              
 Sculpture by the Sea, Bondi Beach, Sydney, Australia
 Mini Masterworks 4, Spirit Wrestler Gallery, Canada
 Whatumanawa, Toi Gallery, Waiheke, New Zealand
 Auckland Art Fair, FHE Gallery, Auckland, New Zealand
2012               
 From A Distance group show, NZ Academy of Fine Arts, Wellington, New Zealand
 Matariki, Toi Gallery, Waiheke, New Zealand
 The Review, Milford Galleries, Dunedin, New Zealand
2011                
 Headland Sculpture on the Gulf, Waiheke Island, New Zealand 
2010               
 Moko Suite – Marti Freidlander/ Chris Bailey, FHE Galleries, 
2009              
 Auckland Art Fair, Auckland, New Zealand
 53rd Venice Biennale – St Maddalena Church, Venice, Italy
 NZ Room. Collaboration with Creative NZ. June – November
 6x6 International Carving Symposium, Lake Serraia, Baselga de Pine, Italy, August 
 Mini Masterworks III, Spirit Wrestler Gallery, Canada, October
2008              
 Mana Whenua, The Lane Gallery, Auckland, March
 Mini Masterworks II, Spirit Wrestler Gallery, Canada, March
 Te Kahui o Matariki, group show and book launch, 
 Motuaarairoa Solo Show, FHE Galleries, Auckland, June
 Tiny Treasures, De Young Museum of Modern Art, San Francisco, USA, 
 Sculpture Onshore Sculpture Symposium, Takapuna, New Zealand, November
2007              
 Maori Mark, The Wellington Event Centre, Wellington
 Mini Masterworks, Spirit Wrestler Gallery, Vancouver, Canada, August
2006              
 Chris Bailey – New Works, Waiheke Community Art Gallery, January
 Art Out There Exhibition, Waiheke Island, Sculpture in the landscape, 
 Creative NZ Exhibition, Tokyo, Japan, November
 Pacific Edge 2006 The Art Bungalow, Kerikeri, February
 Taatai Tupuna, Matariki exhibition Waiheke Community Art Gallery, 
 APEC, virtual exhibition, August 2006 – 2007
2005             
 Toi Maori – The Eternal Thread Exhibition, Yerba Buena Centre for Arts, San Francisco, United States, 
 Toi Iho Exhibition, Te Papa, NZ National Museum, New Zealand

Selected Commissions 
 2016—Kia Piritahi, Part of carving team to help complete the carvings of the traditional Maori meeting house/wharenui, Piritahi Marae, Waiheke, NZ
 2014—Mata Kupenga, Public sculpture for Auckland City Council at Waiheke Public Library, Waiheke Island, Auckland.
 2011—Pou Tu Te Rangi, Public sculptural installation for Britomart Art Trust, Britomart Precinct, Auckland, NZ
 2010—Ringa Whao, film documentary biography on Chris Bailey.
 2009—Commissioned by CNZ to provide works for the NZ Room, 53rd Venice Biennale – St Maddalena Church, Venice, Italy

Personal life 
Bailey is of Ngāti Porou, Ngāti Hako, Ngati Pāoa, Te Aupōuri and Irish descent.

References

External links
 Personal website

1965 births
Living people
New Zealand Māori carvers
New Zealand Māori artists
Te Aupōuri people
Ngāti Porou people
New Zealand artists